Digrammia decorata, the decorated granite, is a species of geometrid moth in the family Geometridae. It is found in North America.

The MONA or Hodges number for Digrammia decorata is 6389.

References

Further reading

 

Macariini
Articles created by Qbugbot
Moths described in 1907